The 1997 Gran Premio Repsol Sport Prototipos was the fourth and final round of the 1997 International Sports Racing Series season. It took place at Circuito Permanente del Jarama, Spain on November 9, 1997.

Official results
Class winners in bold.

Statistics
Pole Position: 1:28.622 - Didier Cottaz (#4 Courage C41-Porsche)
Fastest Lap: 1:29.472 - Jérôme Policand (#4 Courage C41-Porsche)

References

External links
 World Sports Racing Prototypes  - Results

J
1000 km Jarama
International Sports Racing Series Jarama